The Ajo Range is a mountain range in Pima County, Arizona.

References 

Mountain ranges of Arizona
Landforms of Pima County, Arizona